Ed Bicknell is a British music manager and drummer, best known for managing rock band Dire Straits, Mark Knopfler, Gerry Rafferty, Bryan Ferry, Scott Walker and The Blue Nile.

Career
Ed Bicknell was Chairman of Hull University entertainment’s committee from October 1967 to June 1969, when he first got a taste for the music industry. He also ran the folk and jazz and blues societies across the same period.

During that time he promoted shows by Jimi Hendrix, The Who, The Moody Blues, Muddy Waters, John Lee Hooker, Family, Ralph Mctell, Bert Jansch, The Kinks, Jethro Tull, John Mayall, Pink Floyd and numerous others.

London
Moving to London, he played in several bands as drummer, and then became an agent at John Sherry Enterprises, and later NEMS, representing among others Wishbone Ash, Jose Feliciano, Deep Purple, Black Sabbath, Man, The Ramones, Talking Heads, Richie Havens and War.

Whilst working at NEMS in December 1977, he got a call from Phonogram A&R man John Stainze who had just signed a new band, Dire Straits, to the Vertigo label. In January 1978 Ed became their manager, and continued to manage Mark Knopfler as a solo performer for several years after the dissolution of Dire Straits in 1993. He played drums in The Notting Hillbillies formed in 1990 by Mark Knopfler. They recorded one album, Missing...Presumed Having a Good Time, toured the UK and performed two residencies at Ronnie Scott’s Jazz Club in London. In 2000 he stood down as Mark’s manager on an amicable basis.

In 1997, The Blue Nile appointed Ed as a full-time manager for the first time in their career. He extricated the group from their deal with Warner Bros. He also attempted to persuade the band to change their recording habits, but had little success. Bicknell parted ways with the band in 2004, later stating that "in terms of the modern recording world the history of The Blue Nile was the most screwed-up I had ever encountered"

After two years as "Head of International Music" during which time he set up the music department, Bicknell left the London office of William Morris Endeavor in April 2010.

In recent years, he has often appeared on radio and television to discuss music industry issues and has carried out over 80 “interviews“ of leading music industry figures and artists at conferences and educational establishments.

References

External links
Official biography

1948 births
Living people
English businesspeople
English music managers
Musicians from Yorkshire
The Notting Hillbillies members